Keating Massif is a rugged mainly ice-covered massif,  long, rising to approximately , and lying northwest. It is located at the southern edge of the head of Byrd Glacier. The feature includes Mount Fries and forms the southwestern boundary of Zeller Glacier in the Churchill Mountains of Antarctica.

Keating Massif was named in honor of New Zealander Colin Keating, who was the country's Secretary for Justice for the period 1997–2000. He had a distinguished 30-year career in the Public Service, mostly with the New Zealand Ministry of Foreign Affairs and Trade, during which time he had a significant Antarctic focus through his work in the Legal Division and then as the Deputy Secretary responsible for Multi Lateral Affairs, which included the Legal and Antarctic Divisions. Later, as the Deputy Secretary responsible for Corporate Affairs, he retained authority for the Antarctic Policy Unit, at a time of considerable changes to the organizational structure of New Zealand Antarctic institutions from 1985 through to 1993. He provided much of the intellectual input behind New Zealand's work leading to the adoption of the Environment Protocol.

References

Mountains of Oates Land